Aleksei Olegovich Lopatin (born 12 March 1985) is a former Russian professional football player.

Club career
He played in the Russian Football National League for FC Metallurg Lipetsk in 2005.

External links
 

1985 births
Sportspeople from Lipetsk
Living people
Russian footballers
Association football defenders
FC Lokomotiv Moscow players
FC Metallurg Lipetsk players
FC Spartak Tambov players